Danmaku or Danmu (Simplified Chinese: , literally translated as “bullet curtain” and figuratively as “barrage”) is a subtitle system in online video platforms that originates from Japan and popularised in Mainland China. Such system allows user to post moving comments onto a playing video that are synchronized to the video timeline. The comments are typically presented as “shooting” across the screen, resembling a barrage.

History
The term Danmaku (だんまく) originates from a shooting arcade game or Shoot 'em up, “Batsugun” created by now-defunct Japanese developer Toaplan. It is a conventional vertically scrolling shooter game, with a "level up" system for the player's weapons that shoot a lot of bullets across the screen, hence the term Danmaku. Batsugun is the first recorded example of what would become Danmaku and subgenres stemming from it. While Batsugun is not credited with actually creating the Danmaku subgenres, it sets a lot of the modern templates in place.

Japan
Danmaku originated in Japan's video-sharing website Niconico (ニコニコ) in 2006. The videos on the website are mostly generated and uploaded by online users. Niconico provides a comment function which enables viewers to write comments on the screen for the video. The comments will be "shot" onto the screen in a “bullet curtain” likeness, and will be reproduced and displayed in accordance with the time axis thereafter. The comments go beyond real-time, with previous and later comments being shown together.

China
With the rise of Niconico in Mainland China, Chinese video-sharing platforms also began to adopt Danmaku functions, or "Danmu" in Chinese language. Around 2008–2009, Chinese ACG websites AcFun and Bilibili introduced the Danmu system to their video streaming services. Danmu rapidly gained popularity among ACG users in China. Soon, other major Chinese platforms, such as iQiyi, Youku and Tencent Video, followed suit to deploy Danmu. 

The combination of video and synchronous messaging creates a sense of community for the viewer. The messages take multiple forms including spoiler or jump scare warnings, comments, parody, translations including explanatory notes, expert opinion, and special effects created using text, including visual cues. The format also makes use of memes (233333 means "laughter," 666666 means "awesome"), and its own vernacular.  Object recognition technology has also been used to prevent the text occluding key parts of a scene, such as actors or singers.

As of 2016 in China, such messages were able to be posted anonymously, allowing free expression, though some censorship such as removing hate speech and user-reporting of spoilers was practiced. 

Due to its popularity and impact, Danmu has become a topic of scholarly research, including linguistic, sociological, and cultural study as well as potential applications in online learning use.

Characteristics

Interface

Video player with superimposed danmaku
Danmaku comments left by viewers are overlaid directly on the videos and are scrolled across the screen, synchronized specifically to the playback time point where the users input the comments. At certain moments of the videos, user comments fill up the screen giving the appearance of a bullet curtain, or “Danmaku” in Japanese and "Danmu" in Chinese. This movement and synchronization of text creates a co-viewing experience for users who watch the same videos, but at different locations and times. The format also allows more "multi-modal" text than traditional video comment systems - e.g. different font color or screen position.

Editing Danmaku
The Danmaku editor shows the number of connected viewers and Danmaku in real time. However, there is a limit for the viewable Danmaku for each video depending on the duration.
The Danmaku editor also provides an option that allows the user to deactivate the Danmaku function, and also a function to customize the visual effects of Danmaku. This includes changing of font, amount, transparency and speed of texts viewable on screen, activating the anti-block function and filtering comments based on specific characteristics like movement, colour and type of Danmaku.

Others
In a Danmaku website, Users may choose to leave comments in a traditional comment section below the video, however, the content of these comments differ greatly from those that are scrolled simultaneously with the video. The former usually involves users commenting after watching the video, writing the comment from an overall perspective. On the other hand, the synchronic feature danmaku commenting makes it easy for users to leave comments at multiple timestamps in the video, and include other information related to the content in the specific time point of the video.

Computer-mediated communication (CMC) in Danmaku
Danmaku utilises a type of asynchronous text-based computer-mediated communication (CMC) that is experienced synchronously. Comments and annotations appear and disappear from the viewable screen at set times for users  unless playback is interrupted. This interactivity differentiates Danmaku from traditional comment sections, which are typically located below or beside the video and remain as static posts and replies (resembling the structure of an online forum).

Synchronization
Communication between users through the danmaku system is not marked by dates of insertion nor any form of authorship. However, Danmaku does not provide users the option to structure their comments, such as the option to 'reply to comment' unlike many other social media platforms. Instead, Danmaku messages appear in the order of the moment of insertion in the video's timeline.

This distinctive feature promotes user participation at any moment due to the anonymous, spontaneous and democratic nature of the platform. However, participants will be unaware of the possible replies from future viewers as there are no notifications of such responses. Instead the video would have to be periodically reviewed intentionally after leaving the comments. This lack of knowledge creates responses that are delayed and sometimes redundant, leaving less room for productive conversations between Danmaku users.

Some have likened Danmaku to the scrolling, real-time comments in livestream videos, although the latter does not feature such a high level of interference of comments on the video. 
These live-streaming sites that host more concurrent viewers tend to produce massive chats that prioritize crowd-based reactions and interactions over interpersonal conversation.

The temporal incoherence between real time and virtual time is further heightened by the rate of appearance and disappearance of the comment text onscreen. Since there are limits to the number of comments being displayed at one time, older comments are often replaced by new comments. This incites a sense of urgency among the viewers, where the fear of missing a piece of information propels users to search, access and download old Danmaku comments that were flushed out due to the limitations of the platform.

Knowledge-sharing

Subtitling
As Danmaku comments are automatically synced to video, the technology provides opportunity for viewers to spontaneously create translation subtitles for foreign language videos, leading to a sort of “grassroot practice” in which amateur subtitlers are respectfully regarded by others as “caption-kun (字幕君)”.

Usage
Danmaku is widely popular in Japan and Mainland China. Although originated in subcultural areas of anime and gaming, the use of Danmaku has been successfully popularised in China and extended to more mainstream media, appearing in well-known TV dramas or films on streaming media websites. The popularity of Danmaku has also attracted advertisers who wish to target younger consumers, leading to an increased commercialisation of the medium.

There is currently little to no usage of Danmaku or similar systems on Western media platforms. Some have attributed this absence to the fact that the English language has lower entropy than Chinese and Japanese; in other words, Chinese and Japanese may convey more information within the same length of a comment, making it easier to write and read Danmaku. Others have suggested that Danmaku is enjoyed by the more collectivist cultures of East Asia, whereas individualistic viewers (such as Americans) would prefer their viewing experience to not be interfered.

Critique

Distraction
Danmaku is capable of creating huge blocks of comments that overlay and even obscure the video completely, and is therefore highly criticised for its visual clutter that can be extremely distracting, obstructing and annoying, especially for viewers outside China and Japan (which are the only two countries that danmaku had been popularised in) where the Danmaku culture is largely absent. Irrelevant, revealing or unpleasant comments can also ruin one's viewing experience.

Most video platforms like Bilibili allow users to customise Danmaku displays, such as toggling the function off entirely, adjusting the speed of comments, showing selective comments (for example, only showing comments located at the top of the screen), controlling the amount of comments displayed, and filtering out comments containing certain keywords. Some videos use AI technology to prevent Danmaku from obstructing faces or figures of people. If a video reaches a maximum number of Danmaku, some of the comments will also be deleted.

Interactivity
Danmaku facilitates interaction both between the viewer and the video content, and among viewers themselves. Commenters get to share their opinions and feelings immediately as a video plays. In especially notable parts of a video, a large volume of (often highly repetitive) Danmaku comments might occupy the screen, expressing similar emotions. And although the comments are anonymous, they can refer to one another by font colour (“the yellow letters”), location (“the person below”) or content (“the one who said …”). This makes it possible for users to interact, such as answer questions or display disagreement.

Some unique slang and conventions have also arisen as a result. For example, moments before a shocking, exciting or funny scene happens in a video, many Danmaku comments would appear, alerting the viewer, “High energy warning ahead!” (“高能预警!”) preparing the viewer for an upcoming surprise. Hence, Danmaku produces a social experience of co-viewership; the sense of togetherness and belonging is often cited as a major appeal of Danmaku videos.

Censorship
Since its popularisation by AcFun and Bilibili, Danmaku has been adopted by more and more video streaming platforms in China, such as iQiyi, Youku and Tencent Videos. To manage the comments, government regulations and censorship have tightened; in 2019, the Online Short Video Platform Management Regulations were enforced, requiring Danmaku comments to be reviewed before being published.

References

Further reading

Japanese words and phrases
Subtitling
Online chat
Video game terminology